Schmuck is a surname of German origin.  As a noun, it means jewelry; as an adjective, it means neat in the sense of clean, tidy, or having a simple elegance.  The name is commonly seen on signs and billboards in Germany and Austria related to the merchandising of precious jewelry. The Schmuck family name has been traced to the birth of Christian von Schmuck in 1370. In 1624, an Armorial Patent, or Coat of Arms, was granted at Rattenberg by Archduke Leopold V of Austria.

There are other associated surname variations throughout Central Europe, as Hungary and Romania, including spelling variations of Szmuk in these countries.

Persons with the surname
Andor Schmuck (born 1970), Hungarian politician
Christina Schmuck (born 1944), West German Olympic luger 
Donald Schmuck (1915–2004), U.S. Marine Corps brigadier general and recipient of the Navy Cross
Erzsébet Schmuck (born 1954), Hungarian environmentalist, economist, and politician
Marcus Schmuck (1925–2005), Austrian mountaineer who led the expedition to climb Karakoram in Pakistan
Michal Schmuck (1909–1980), Czechoslovak/Slovak water polo player who competed in the 1928 and 1936 Summer Olympics
Peter Schmuck (born 1955), American sports columnist

See also
 Schmuck (pejorative)
 Schmuck (disambiguation)

German-language surnames